Naskal is a village and panchayat in Medak district, Telangana, India. It falls under Ramayampet mandal.

Politics
Medak Lok Sabha constituency is one of the 17 Lok Sabha (Lower House of the Parliament) constituencies in Telangana state in India.

References

Villages in Medak district